Tsai Ping-kun (born 1959) is a Taiwanese politician.

Early life and education
Tsai was born in Caotun, Nantou County, in 1959. He obtained his bachelor's degree from National Dong Hwa University, and master's and doctoral degree in education from National Chengchi University.

Career
Tsai was an independent politician before joining the Taiwan People's Party. He worked for the Ministry of Education as a division chief and was deputy commissioner of the Taichung County Cultural Affairs Department. Tsai served as president of the National Taichung First Senior High School through 2007, becoming principal at Taipei Municipal Jianguo High School in 2008. In 2010, Tsai was appointed deputy mayor of Taichung, alongside Hsiao Chia-chi, and under Jason Hu. Between 2015 and 2016, Tsai was deputy minister of culture.  Tsai served as a mediator between the Executive Yuan and student protestors who organized the Anti-Black Box Curriculum Movement in 2015. In March 2019, Tsai was appointed deputy mayor of Taipei by Ko Wen-je.

Tsai was hospitalized on July 11, 2022 at Taipei's Renai City Hospital after suffering a hemorrhagic stroke.

References

External links

 

1959 births
Living people
Deputy mayors of Taichung
Deputy mayors of Taipei
National Chengchi University alumni
National Dong Hwa University alumni
Heads of schools in Taiwan
21st-century Taiwanese educators
20th-century Taiwanese educators
Government ministers of Taiwan
Politicians of the Republic of China on Taiwan from Nantou County